Events in the year 2023 in Sweden.

Incumbents
 Monarch – Carl XVI Gustaf
 Prime minister – Ulf Kristersson

Anniversaries
 Golden Jubilee of Carl XVI Gustaf
 Gothenburg quadricentennial jubilee

Events 
 January 12 – Swedish mining company LKAB announces it has discovered Europe's largest known deposit of rare-earth elements in Kiruna.
 January 19 – Swedish Defence Minister Pål Jonson announces that Sweden will send its self-propelled Archer Artillery System, 50 Combat Vehicle 90 IFVs, and NLAW anti-tank missiles to Ukraine as part of its latest military support package for the Ukrainian military.
2 February: Muharrem Demirok is appointed new leader for the Swedish Centre Party, during its meeting in Helsingborg, following Annie Lööf's resignation.

Scheduled events
late March and early April – 2023 Bandy World Championship (men's) and the 2023 Women's Bandy Championships in Åby, Växjö. Both the men's and women's tournaments hosted together.

Deaths 

 January 2 – Kajsa Thoor, 51, Swedish television presenter.
 January 8 – Patrick Grimlund, 50, Swedish television presenter.
 January 13 – Klas Lestander, 91, Swedish biathlete, Olympic champion (1960).
 January 15 – Jane Cederqvist, 77, Swedish swimmer, historian and government official, Olympic silver medalist (1960).
 January 16 – Mats Nordberg, 64, Swedish politician, MP (since 2018).

References

 
2020s in Sweden
Years of the 21st century in Sweden
Sweden
Sweden